Edwin Elton (born 5 October 1939) is a Nomura Professor of Finance at New York University Stern School of Business and Academic Director of the Stern Doctoral Program.  Professor Elton also teaches for the Master of Science in Global Finance (MSGF), which is a joint program between Stern and the Hong Kong University of Science and Technology.

Biography
Professor Elton has served as a portfolio theory and investment management consultant for major financial institutions in Asia, Europe, and the United States.  He has been a senior research fellow at the International Institute of Management in Berlin and a visiting scholar at the European Institute for Advanced Studies in Management (EIASM) in Brussels and at Katholieke Universiteit Leuven.

Professor Elton received the Graham Dodd Award for research in investments and was named Distinguished Scholar by the Eastern Finance Association.  He is a former president of the American Finance Association.

Professor Elton is currently associate editor of Journal of Banking and Finance and Journal of Accounting, Auditing, and Finance, and was also formerly co-managing editor of The Journal of Finance.   He has been a member of the board of directors of the American Finance Association and an associate editor of Management Science.

He received his BS in Math from Ohio Wesleyan, and his MS and PhD in Industrial Administration from Carnegie-Mellon.

Publications
Professor Elton has authored or coauthored eight books and over 110 articles.  His book, Modern Portfolio Theory and Investment Analysis, is the standard textbook used in most leading graduate schools of business.

References

External links
NYU Stern Profile
Edwin Elton’s Biography
List of Books on Amazon
Master of Science in Global Finance

New York University Stern School of Business faculty
American economists
1939 births
Ohio Wesleyan University alumni
Tepper School of Business alumni
Living people
Corporate finance theorists
Financial economists
Presidents of the American Finance Association